Fréjus Zerbo (born April 2, 1989) is a Burkinabé-born Ivorian professional basketball player, who plays as a center and lastly played for Pro A team JL Bourg.

Professional career
In June 2010, Zerbo signed with BCM Gravelines of the French Pro A. In 2011, Zerbo left BCM for Limoges CSP. In June 2014, he re-signed with Limoges. July 2015, Zerbo signed a 5-year extension with Limoges. In January 2018, he was loaned to Antibes Sharks until the end of the season.

On November 15, 2018 he has signed a 1 month deal with Pro A team JL Bourg. His contract has been extended until the end of season on December 28, 2019.

National team
He holds Ivorian passport and lived in Ivory Coast as a child. He opted to represent Ivory Coast national basketball team and was included in a roster for 2019 FIBA World Cup.

References

External links 
RealGM profile

1989 births
Living people
BCM Gravelines players
Burkinabé men's basketball players
Centers (basketball)
JL Bourg-en-Bresse players
Limoges CSP players
Olympique Antibes basketball players
2019 FIBA Basketball World Cup players
21st-century Burkinabé people